This is a list of members of the Western Australian Legislative Council from 22 May 1954 to 21 May 1956. The chamber had 30 seats made up of ten provinces each electing three members, on a system of rotation whereby one-third of the members would retire at each biennial election.

Notes
 On 25 June 1955, South-East Province Labor MLC Robert Boylen died. Liberal candidate John Cunningham, who had represented the area until his defeat the previous year by Labor's Jim Garrigan, won the resulting by-election on 10 September 1955.
 On 22 June 1955, South-West Province Liberal MLC Charles Henning died. Liberal candidate Francis Drake Willmott won the resulting by-election on 10 September 1955.
 On 20 March 1956, Metropolitan Province Liberal MLC Harry Hearn died. Liberal candidate Reg Mattiske won the resulting by-election on 9 June 1956.

Sources
 
 
 

Members of Western Australian parliaments by term